Kingsmead College is a private girls' primary and high school situated in Melrose, Johannesburg, Gauteng, South Africa. The school is located next to the Gautrain Rosebank Station. Kingsmead College caters for girls from Grade 000 to Grade 12 and has around 870 students.

History
Kingsmead College was founded by Doris Vera Thompson in October 1933 and in 1934 opened its doors to 136 girls, from Grade 1 to Post-Matriculation.

Over the years, houses and gardens adjacent to the original property were purchased, providing further buildings needed to cater for a steadily increasing amount of young girls coming to the school.
Doris Vera Thompson helped to plan St Brigid's Chapel on the school grounds and she considered the simple building to be the “heart of the school.” From 1939 onwards, the Boarders used the Chapel regularly until 1999, when the Boarding House was closed.

Each class attends Chapel Assembly regularly during the term.

The Chapel is open daily during the week from 07h00 to 17h00 and, on Sundays, it is used by the Kingsmead Christian Fellowship for Christian worship and prayer. Many Old Kingsmeadians return to the Chapel for weddings and Christenings. The chapel is dedicated to St. Brigid.

Organisation
Kingsmead College teaches Grades 000-Matric.

Junior School
The Junior School consists of Grades 1–7. Grades 1-6 wear a green checkered dress, with black school shoes, white socks, and a green blazer. A jersey is optional. Grade 7 wears the Senior School uniform of a blazer, white shirt, tartan skirt, white socks and black school shoes.

Senior School
Mrs Palmer is Headmistress of the Senior School (Grades 8-12). These grades wear a blazer, white shirt, tartan skirt, white socks and black school shoes.

Affiliations
The school is a member of the Independent Schools Association of Southern Africa.

Notable alumni
Denise Scott Brown, architect
Elizabeth de la Porte, harpsichordist
Margaret Marshall, Chief Justice of the Massachusetts Supreme Judicial Court
Topaz Page-Green, fashion model and the founder and president of the non-profit corporation The Lunchbox Fund 
Larraine Segil, entrepreneur, attorney, advisor, lecturer, author, board member and urban farmer 
Janet Suzman, actress
Lauren Mellor, model
Maureen Thelma Watson, politician
Julia Vincent (2012) - South African diver

External links
 
 Kingsmead College Digital Archives

References

Girls' schools in South Africa
Schools in Johannesburg
Nondenominational Christian schools in South Africa
Private schools in Gauteng
Educational institutions established in 1933
1933 establishments in South Africa